Into the Labyrinth, the eighteenth studio album by British heavy metal band Saxon, was released on 9 January 2009. It was made between tours in 2008 and written by the band in England and at Biff Byford's house in France. The first single, "Live to Rock", was released on 17 October 2008. The album sold about 1,000 copies in the US in the week after its release.

A proper physical fourteenth track is featured on the Japanese CD pressing, released on 3 February 2009. Previously, it sold as a compressed, low-bitrate download.

The song "Coming Home" is originally from Saxon's Killing Ground album, in an electric version.

In November 2008, Saxon announced a "Riff King" competition, for fans who could play a solo for "Live to Rock". The winner was Claudio Kiari of Brazil.

"When I wrote 'Valley of the Kings'," recalled Byford, "I had to get it right with the pharaohs and stuff, or else some wiseass would go, 'Hey, you got the wrong Rameses!'"

Track listing

Personnel
 Biff Byford – lead vocals
 Paul Quinn – lead guitar
 Doug Scarratt – rhythm guitar
 Nibbs Carter – bass guitar
 Nigel Glockler – drums
 Matthias Ulmer – keyboards

Charts

References

2009 albums
Saxon (band) albums
SPV/Steamhammer albums
Albums produced by Charlie Bauerfeind